Elections to Lisburn Borough Council were held on 7 June 2001 on the same day as the other Northern Irish local government elections. The election used five district electoral areas to elect a total of 30 councillors.

Election results

Note: "Votes" are the first preference votes.

Districts summary

|- class="unsortable" align="centre"
!rowspan=2 align="left"|Ward
! % 
!Cllrs
! % 
!Cllrs
! %
!Cllrs
! %
!Cllrs
! % 
!Cllrs
! %
!Cllrs
!rowspan=2|TotalCllrs
|- class="unsortable" align="center"
!colspan=2 bgcolor="" | UUP
!colspan=2 bgcolor="" | DUP
!colspan=2 bgcolor="" | Sinn Féin
!colspan=2 bgcolor="" | Alliance
!colspan=2 bgcolor="" | SDLP
!colspan=2 bgcolor="white"| Others
|-
|align="left"|Downshire
|bgcolor="40BFF5"|43.7
|bgcolor="40BFF5"|3
|31.1
|1
|1.3
|0
|14.2
|1
|0.0
|0
|9.7
|0
|5
|-
|align="left"|Dunmurry Cross
|13.4
|1
|7.9
|0
|bgcolor="#008800"|53.9
|bgcolor="#008800"|4
|0.0
|0
|23.0
|2
|1.8
|0
|7
|-
|align="left"|Killultagh
|bgcolor="40BFF5"|35.2
|bgcolor="40BFF5"|2
|29.9
|2
|5.2
|0
|6.4
|0
|14.9
|1
|8.4
|0
|5
|-
|align="left"|Lisburn Town North
|bgcolor="40BFF5"|44.0
|bgcolor="40BFF5"|4
|17.1
|1
|4.2
|0
|17.7
|1
|0.0
|0
|17.0
|1
|7
|-
|align="left"|Lisburn Town South
|bgcolor="40BFF5"|47.3
|bgcolor="40BFF5"|3
|19.9
|1
|3.5
|0
|21.2
|1
|0.0
|0
|8.1
|0
|6
|- class="unsortable" class="sortbottom" style="background:#C9C9C9"
|align="left"| Total
|35.2
|13
|20.2
|5
|16.0
|4
|11.0
|3
|8.5
|3
|9.1
|2
|30
|-
|}

Districts results

Downshire

1997: 2 x UUP, 1 x DUP, 1 x Alliance, 1 x Conservative
2001: 3 x UUP, 1 x DUP, 1 x Alliance
1997-2001 Change: UUP gain from Conservative

Dunmurry Cross

1997: 4 x Sinn Féin, 1 x SDLP, 1 x UUP, 1 x Independent
2001: 4 x Sinn Féin, 2 x SDLP, 1 x DUP
1997-2001 Change: SDLP gain from Independent

Killultagh

1997: 3 x UUP, 1 x DUP, 1 x SDLP
2001: 2 x DUP, 2 x UUP, 1 x SDLP
1997-2001 Change: DUP gain from UUP

Lisburn Town North

1997: 3 x UUP, 1 x Alliance, 1 x UDP, 1 x Independent Unionist, 1 x Protestant Unionist
2001: 4 x UUP, 1 x Alliance, 1 x DUP, 1 x Independent
1997-2001 Change: UUP and DUP gain from UDP and Protestant Unionist, Independent Unionist becomes Independent

Lisburn Town South

1997: 4 x UUP, 1 x Alliance, 1 x UDP
2001: 3 x UUP, 1 x Alliance, 1 x DUP, 1 x Independent
1997-2001 Change: DUP gain from UUP, UDP becomes Independent

References

Lisburn City Council elections
Lisburn